Operation Excess was a military operation launched by the Rhodesian Security Forces, on 27 July 1968, in response to an incursion of ZIPRA terrorists in Mashonaland West province.

The Operation
The cadres were detected on 26 July when a Ministry of Internal Affairs (INTAF) employee discovered unfamiliar bootprints in the bush near Makuti. Joint Operations Command (JOC) was moved south-east to Karoi on 28 July, and 2 Commando was deployed there. 3 Commando was sent with Tactical HQ to patrol the Angwa River Bridge, to the north-east, near the border with Mozambique. 

This squad was organised in five sections, three of eight men each and two of seven men each.

The Support Group, which was already based up at Kanyemba, sent one of its troops into the area along with six Police Anti-Terrorist Unit (PATU) teams. E Company, RAR moved to the west to act as stops. 

7 Troop, 2 Commando and the Support Group troop followed tracks to discover a vacant insurgent camp in the early morning on 28 July; the guerrillas had been made nervous by the increased helicopter activity north of their location and left. 13 Troop found fresh tracks the next morning and followed them. By the end of the operation, the insurgents had taken 23 casualties, 15 killed and 8 captured, for 1 Rhodesian soldier wounded.

References

Bibliography

Excess
1968 in Rhodesia